Lycée Vaucanson is a senior high school/sixth-form college in Grenoble, France.

It originated from the Petit Séminaire du Rondeau, established in 1815, and the Ecole Supérieur, established in 1836. The institution took the name Ecole Professionnelle Vaucanson in 1876 in honor of the French inventor Jacques de Vaucanson.

 the school had 1,100 students. It has a boarding facility.

References

External links
 Lycée Vaucanson

Schools in Grenoble
Lycées in Isère